The Macau Red Cross is a branch of the Red Cross in Macau. The headquarters is in the China Civil Plaza in Sé.

It is the humanitarian organisation in the territory that has existed for the longest time.

The previous head office is in São Lourenço.

History
The 's presence in Macau began in 1920, and became established as a delegation in 1943. A chapter of the book The Red Cross Movement described the Macau Red Cross as "simultaneously, a local creation, a delegation integrated into a national/colonial context, an inter-imperial structure and part of a transnational institution with global reach." The Macau Red Cross left the Portuguese organisation and joined the Red Cross Society of China effective 20 December 1999.

It first opened in 1964 and had its current facility open in 2017.

References
  - Read chapter online

Notes

External links

 Macau Red Cross

Red Cross and Red Crescent national societies
1920 establishments in China
Medical and health organisations based in Macau